Richard Gahr High School, often simply known as Gahr High School, is a public, STEAM (Science, Technology, Engineering, Art, and Math) magnet high school in Cerritos, California, serving grades 9-12. Gahr High is one of three comprehensive high schools in the ABC Unified School District.

The school is a two-time (2007, 2021) California Distinguished School.

History
Gahr High School opened  in 1965 as the first high school in both the newly unified ABC Unified School District, and the recently incorporated City of Dairy Valley (the city would be renamed to its current state two years later).  The school was officially named after Richard Gahr, who had served as the school district's superintendent. During the 1970s, as the student population in Cerritos rapidly grew, Cerritos High School was created for district expansion, and during its construction the latter used part of the Gahr campus.

Academics

Enrollment
As of the school year 2021–22, there were a total of 1,828 students attending the high school.

Hispanic or Latino - 52.5% (959)
Black - 14.1% (258)
Asian - 12.9% (236)
Filipino - 10.2% (186)
White - 6.3% (116)
Other/Unreported - 4.0% (73)

Awards
The school is a two-time (2007, 2021) California Distinguished School.

Notable alumni

 Bret Barberie (1985) - Major League Baseball player (1991–1996)
 Morris Chestnut (1986) - actor (boyz in the hood)
 Chris Devenski (2008) Major League Baseball player, Pitcher, Houston Astros (2016 -)
 Jacob Faria (2011) Major League Baseball player, Tampa Bay Rays of Major League Baseball (MLB) (2017 - 2019), Milwaukee Brewers of Major League Baseball (MLB) (2019 - )
 Shane Mack (1981) - Major League Baseball player (1990–1994)
 Kris Medlen (2003) - MLB pitcher for the Atlanta Braves
 Tom Nieto (1978) - Major League Baseball player (1984–1990)
 Al Osuna (1983) - Major League Baseball player (1990–1994, 1996)
 Valentino Pascucci (1996) - Major League Baseball player.
 Nicolle Payne (1994) - UCLA water polo goalie; Silver medalist in 2000 Sydney Olympics; Bronze medalist in 2004 Athens Olympics.
 Steve Shak (1996) - Pro Soccer player and first round draft pick of MLS Superdraft in 2000, played for the NY Metro-Stars and the Colorado Rapids.
 Broderick Thompson (1978) - NFL player (1984, 1986 -1996)
 Casper Ware (2008) - NCAA basketball player for the Long Beach State 49ers.
 Joshua Perkins (2012) - National Football League tight end, Joshua Perkins (2016- )
 Dwayne Washington (2012) - National Football League running back, New Orleans Saints (2018- )
 Jim Zorn (1971) - Seattle Seahawks Quarterback (1976–1987); Head Coach of the Washington Redskins (2008–2009).

References

External links

 
 Gahr Marching Gladiators Website
 Gahr High School Athletics

Cerritos, California
Educational institutions established in 1965
ABC Unified School District
High schools in Los Angeles County, California
Public high schools in California
1965 establishments in California